Miss Colombia 2008, the 74th Miss Colombia pageant, was held in Cartagena de Indias, Colombia, on November 17, 2008, after two weeks of events.  The winner of the pageant was Michelle Rouillard, Miss Cauca.

The pageant was broadcast live on RCN TV from the Centro de Convenciones Julio César Turbay in Cartagena de Indias, Colombia. At the conclusion of the final night of competition, outgoing titleholder Miss Colombia 2007 Taliana Vargas crowned Michelle Rouillard of Cauca as the new Miss Colombia.

Judges
The former panel of judges was composed by Olga Sinclair (Panama), Pablo Jiménez Burillo (Spain), Sylvia Loria (Costa Rica), Thomas P. Murray (United States), Giovanni Scutaro (Venezuela).

Results

Placements

*

Special awards
 Miss Photogenic (voted by press reporters) - Michelle Rouillard Estrada (Cauca)
 Best Body Figura Bodytech - Stephanie Garcés Aljure (Valle)
 Miss Elegance - Lina Marcela Mosquera Ochoa  (Chocó)
 Best Face -  Ina Andrea Ontiveros Casas (Norte de Santander)
 Reina de la policia - Lina Marcela Mosquera Ochoa  (Chocó)
 Señorita Puntualidad - Sonia Janneth Cubides Silva (Bogotá D.C.)
 Best Regional Costume -  Andrea Lilian Tirado Reina (Sucre) - "Pola Becté", Design by Erick Pérez
 Miss Congeniality - Cindy Kohn Cybulkiewicz (Guajira)
 Zapatilla Real - Giselle Marín Ramos (Cartagena D.T. y C.)

Final Competition Scores

Delegates

According to the press release from  September 11 of 2008 on the website of the National Beauty Contest of Colombia, The official candidates are:

Withdrawals
 Marianna Rodriguez was replaced by Stephanie Garcés Aljure as Señorita Valle after pictures of Marianna posing in underwear surface.
 Sonia Janneth Cubides Silva resing her title as Segunda Princesa to pursuit an acting career

References and footnotes

External links
Official site
Canal RCN: Concurso Nacional de Belleza

Miss Colombia
2008 in Colombia
2008 beauty pageants